Machine Creek is a rural locality in the Gladstone Region, Queensland, Australia.

Geography 
The locality presumably takes its name from the watercourse Machine Creek which flows through the south-east of the locality.

The Bruce Highway runs along the northern boundary.

Butchers Corner is a neighbourhood in the south of the locality.

The land use is predominantly grazing on native vegetation.

History 
Machine Creek State School opened on 27 July 1911 under head teacher Olivia Kettle. The school closed on 10 July 1970 due to low student numbers. It was at 540 Mount Larcom Bracewell Road (north-west corner of Ambrose Bracewell Road). The school building was later relocated to the Calliope River Historical Village at River Ranch.

Education 
There are no schools in Machine Creek. The nearest government primary schools are Ambrose State School in neighbouring Ambrose to the north and Mount Larcom State School in neighbouring Mount Larcom to the north-east. The nearest government secondary schools are Mount Larcom State School (to Year 10) in neighbouring Mount Larcom and Gladstone State High School in West Gladstone to the east.

See also

 List of schools in Central Queensland

References

Further reading 

  — also includes closed schools: Bracewell State School, Raglan State School, Cedar Vale State School, East End State School, Hourigan Creek School, Hut Creek School, Langmorn School, Langmorn Creek Crossing School, Machine Creek State School

Gladstone Region
Localities in Queensland